is a passenger railway station located in the city of Machida, Tokyo, Japan, operated by the private railway company, Keio Corporation.

Lines 

Layout 
This station consists of two ground-level opposed side platforms serving two tracks.

Platforms

History
The station opened on April 6, 1991. From 22 February 2013, station numbering was introduced on Keio lines, with Tamasakai Station becoming "KO44".

Passenger statistics
In fiscal 2019, the station was used by an average of 20,530 passengers daily.

Surrounding area
 Tama New Town

See also
 List of railway stations in Japan

References

External links

Tamasakai Station page on official Keiō website - 

Railway stations in Tokyo
Railway stations in Japan opened in 1991
Keio Sagamihara Line
Stations of Keio Corporation
Machida, Tokyo